John Walter Eversley, MBE is the director and vice-chairman of Tyne and Wear Enterprise Trust Ltd. (ENTRUST), in Newcastle upon Tyne. He was appointed MBE in the 1992 Birthday Honours. In 2008, he was awarded the Queen's Award for Enterprise Promotion - the  only lifetime achievement awardee that year.

References

Queen's Award for Enterprise Promotion (2008)
British businesspeople
Living people
Members of the Order of the British Empire
Queen's Award for Enterprise Promotion (lifetime achievement)
Year of birth missing (living people)